MTV 00s (pronounced on-air as MTV Noughties, MTV Aughts, MTV 2000s or MTV Zeros) is a music television channel featuring music videos from the 2000s. It was launched on August 2, 2021, replacing VH1 Europe.

History

Before launch
On September 6, 2014, a program featuring music videos from the 2000s "Sounds Of The 00s" appeared on VH1 Classic Europe. In April 2015, VH1 Classic Europe started broadcasting a marathon of 2000s music videos - "Nothing But The 00s", which aired every three weeks - on weekends. On January 10, 2018, another program appeared on VH1 Classic Europe - "00s Boys vs 00s Girls". At the end of June 2018, all of these programs were cancelled. On October 1, 2018, "Sounds Of The 00s" was renamed to "Nothing But The 00s".

Pop-up channel and the launch
From May 29 to June 22, 2020, MTV OMG was temporarily rebranded to MTV 00s.

Starting from June 5, 2021, the channel VH1 Europe introduced more singles from the 00s era, and partially adapted its programming towards it. August 1, 2021, - the 40th anniversary of MTV - the channel VH1 Europe has stopped an broadcasts of the regular programs, and broadcast only 00s singles with a new grid of an programms MTV 00s and with logo VH1. Since August 2, 2021, the channel MTV 00s broadcasts round the clock, having replaced VH1 Europe.
The first music video on MTV 00s was "Can't Fight the Moonlight" by LeAnn Rimes at 05:00 CET.

Executors and groups of the international musical scene of these years are on air presented. MTV 00s offers a wide choice all your favorite music videos of the best modern pop, rock, electronic, hip hop and soul music of various executors: Alicia Keys, Amy Winehouse, Adele, City High, Christina Aguilera, Eve, Madonna, Kylie Minogue, Gwen Stefani (from No Doubt), Mariah Carey, Sophie Ellis-Bextor, Britney Spears, Dido, Nelly Furtado, Avril Lavigne, P!nk, Kelly Clarkson, Shakira, Rihanna, Katy Perry, Lady Gaga, Beyoncé (from Destiny's Child), Jennifer Lopez (aka J-Lo), Joss Stone, Samantha Mumba, Cascada, Delta Goodrem, Robbie Williams, Ronan Keating, Justin Timberlake, Ricky Martin, James Blunt, Enrique Iglesias, Michael Bublé, Westlife, Blue, Daniel Bedingfield, James Morrison, Will Young, Mika, Jack Johnson Jason Mraz, Backstreet Boys, Jonas Brothers, Usher, Akon, Sisqó, Ja Rule, Chris Brown, Rob Thomas, Jason Derulo, Ne-Yo, Eminem, Outkast, Missy Elliott, Kanye West, 50 Cent, Fat Joe, S Club 7, Black Eyed Peas, Gnarls Barkley, Sugababes, Girls Aloud, Spice Girls (Melanie C, Emma Bunton, Geri Halliwell), Pussycat Dolls, Maroon 5, Santana, U2, R.E.M., Red Hot Chili Peppers, Bon Jovi, Lenny Kravitz, Plain White T's, Oasis, Franz Ferdinand, The Darkness, Kings of Leon, Foo Fighters, Coldplay, Vampire Weekend, Travis, Nickelback, Tenacious D, Scissor Sisters, Green Day, Fall Out Boy, Panic At The Disco, Blink-182, My Chemical Romance, Queens of the Stone Age, The Rasmus, Tokio Hotel, Wheatus, Alien Ant Farm, Limp Bizkit, Linkin Park, Papa Roach, Evanescence, Crazy Town, The Temper Trap, White Stripes, Muse, Snow Patrol, Keane, Jet, Kaiser Chiefs, The Script, Razorlight, Hives, Bowling for Soup, Creed, System of a Down, Paramore, Arctic Monkeys, The Strokes, The Killers, Audioslave, Editors, The All American Rejects, Kasabian, Gossip, The Raconteurs, Gorillaz, Moby, Calvin Harris, David Guetta, Scooter, Daft Punk, Eric Prydz, Supermen Lovers, D.B. Boulevard, BodyRockers among many others.

Strips with the name of a song, the executor and the announcement of a following music video are stylised that were used in this decade.

Some of the songs officially released in 1999 are broadcast in this channel. Notably, a few of them (from Blink 182, Santana, Alice Deejay, Moby, Bloodhound Gang or Tom Jones) are also broadcast on MTV 90s. In addition, the segment featuring Shakira broadcast song from 10s era - Waka Waka (This Time for Africa). Finally, the song It wasn't me by Shaggy shows the video from MTV Unplugged 2020 performance.

Hits

Programmes

Regular programming
"We Love The 00s!"
"Hits Don't Lie"
"Non-Stop Nostalgia"

Daily specials
"Class Of…!" (2000-2009)
"2-4-1 Hits!"
"Artist vs Artist" (alt. name: "Artist X Artist", "Epic Videos! Artist vs. Artist" or "Stars of MTV: Artist vs. Artist")
Avril Lavigne
Beyonce
Britney Spears
Christina Aguilera
Jennifer Lopez
Justin Timberlake
Kelly Clarkson
Nelly Furtado
P!nk
Rihanna
"Can't Fight the Pop Ballads!"
"Chillout Zone"
"Classic Collabs!"
"Crazy In Love!"
"Dancefloor Fillers!"
"Rap & R'N'B' Jamz"
"Rock'N'Roll Anthems!"

The 40 Greatest…!

Boys
Collabs
Dance Anthems
Girls
Groups
Love Songs
Party Hits
Pop vs. Hip-Hop & R'n'B
Rock Anthems vs. Pop Hits
Party Hits vs. Power Ballads (alt. name: Party vs. Power Ballads)
Power Ballads
R'n'B Hits
R'n'b & Hip Hop Vs Dance Anthems
Rock Anthems
Boys In Love!
Heartbreak Hits!
Feelgood Love Songs From the Girls!
Global Girls of the 00s!
 Worldwide Anthems From The Girls!
 Hey Ladies! 40 Party Anthems
Girls in Love!
 Feel-Good Love Songs!

Yearly events

Valentine's Day
Girls in Love!

Women's Day
Non-Stop Nostalgia From the Girls!
We Love the 00s Girls!
2-4-1 Hits From the Girls!

Europe Day
Euro Dance Hits!
Euro Floorfillers!
Euro Party Hits!
Euro Pop Hits!

International Men's Day
"Worldwide Hits From The Boys!"
"Rock Vs Pop: The Boys!"

New Year
"All Day Party!" (December 31, 2021)
"Non-Stop New Year's Party!" (December 31, 2021)
"It's A 00s New Year's Party!" (December 31, 2022)
"Happy New Year from MTV 00s!" (December 31, 2022)

Other

January 2023
Legends
"Stars of MTV"
The Boys
The Girls

August 2022
Dance
"Dance Hits of the 00s!"
"Dance Hits from the Boys!"
"Dance Hits from the Girls!"

September 2022
R'n'b
"Hottest R'n'B Anthems!"

October 2022
Feelgood
"Feelgood Anthems!"
"Feelgood Anthems From the Boys!"
"Feelgood Anthems From the Girls!"
"Feelgood Dance Anthems!"
"Feelgood Love Anthems!"
"Feelgood Pop Anthems!"

November 2022
Rock
"Pop-Punk Anthems!"
"Worldwide Rock Anthems!"

December 2022
Greatest
"Get The Party Started!"
"Best Love Songs Of The 00s!"
"Best Groups Of The 00s!"
"Best Collabs Of The 00s!"
"Best Pop Songs Of The 00s!"

Discontinued

August 2, 2021 - present
"Artist: The Hits"
"Artist vs. artist"
Black Eyed Peas
Coldplay
Destiny's Child
Eminem
Enrique Iglesias
Jay-Z 
Kylie Minogue
Linkin Park
Maroon 5
Shakira
The 40 Greatest... 
Boys vs. Girls
Hits!
Pop Anthems Ever
Get The Party Started! 40 Hits
Best Videos of the 00s!
Mega Hits From The Boys!
The Greatest Showmen of the 00s!
Party Anthems From The Boys!
Feel-Good Anthems From The Boys!
Epic Videos From the Boys!
Epic Videos From the Girls!
Epic Videos Of the 00s!
Best Of The Girls!
Mega Hits From The Girls!
Rock Legends! Anthems
MTV Stars of the 00s!
Superstar DJs! 40 Dance Hits
MTV Stars of the 00s!

May 29 - June 22, 2020
"00s Pop Obsessions!"
"00s: Official Top 50"
"100% 00s Hits!"
"20 Girl Group Hits Of The 00s!"
"Showgirl Kylie 00s Hits!"
"2-4-1 00s Happy Hour Hits!"
"Sing-A-Long With The 00s! Top 50"
"00s Pop Battle"
"Class Of..."
"00s Weekend Obsessions!"
"00s Weekend Hits!"
"The 40 Greatest Ballads Of The 00s"
"Hits of the 00s!"
"Hottest 20 00s Debuts"

References

Music television channels
MTV
Television channels and stations established in 2021
Television channels in the Netherlands
Television channels in North Macedonia
2021 establishments in Europe